Rattle Hill is a mountain in Sullivan County, New York. It is located north-northwest of Grooville. Beech Mountain is located east-northeast, Burnt Hill is located west-southwest and Gray Hill is located south-southwest of Rattle Hill.

References

Mountains of Sullivan County, New York
Mountains of New York (state)